Canicule may refer to:

 The dog days of summer
 Dog Day (French: Canicule), a 1984 film